The London Film Critics Circle Award for Actor of the Year is an annual award given by the London Film Critics Circle.

Winners

1990s

2000s

2010s

2020s

References
 London Film Critics' Circle Awards – IMDb

Film awards for lead actor
A